Double trap is a shotgun shooting sport, one of the ISSF shooting events. Participants use a shotgun to attempt to break a clay disk flung away from the shooter at high speed.

The layout of double trap shooting is similar to that of trap shooting. The shooter stands 16 yards behind the house that releases the targets. Two targets are released simultaneously from the house. They follow set paths, usually 35 degrees to left and right of straightaway. The shooter can take one shot at each target.

History
In international Double Trap competitions, the course of fire is 75 doubles for both men and women. The men's event involves a 25-double final for the top six competitors. The women's event was taken off the Olympic program after the 2004 Summer Olympics. Final shooting for women was discontinued in international competition as a result. The men's event was taken off the Olympic Program prior to the 2020 Summer Olympics resulting in the event being taken off from the ISSF World Cup but still remaining in the ISSF World Championships, Commonwealth Games, Asian Games etc. .

Olympic Games

Men

Women

World Championships, Men

References:

World Championships, Men Team

World Championships, Women

World Championships, Women Team

World Championships, total medals

Current world records

See also
ISSF Olympic trap
ISSF Olympic skeet
ISSF shooting events

References

External links

ISSF shooting events
Shotgun shooting sports
Rifle and pistol shooting sports
Clay pigeon shooting